Dilatancy may refer to:
 Dilatancy (granular material): an increase in volume under shear
 Dilatancy (viscous material): the solidification of viscous fluids under pressure